Setiawangsa–Pantai Expressway (SPE), is partially-opened, under construction and one of the expressways in Klang Valley, Malaysia. The  expressway connects Taman Melati and Klang Gates from Kuala Lumpur Middle Ring Road 2 to Kerinchi Link near Pantai and University of Malaya. The alignment of Setiawangsa–Pantai Expressway will traverse north to south of Kuala Lumpur and will serve areas such as University Tunku Abdul Rahman, Wangsa Maju, Setiawangsa, Ampang, the Tun Razak Exchange & Bandar Malaysia development corridor and Kerinchi as well as providing a connection to Kuala Lumpur-Karak Experessay to the east coast. It was built and maintained by Ekovest Berhad. It is formerly known as DUKE Phase 3.

Route background 
The expressway is still under construction but some sections are to open up gradually. Most sections of this expressway are elevated. Once completed, it will have seven interchanges and a fewe toll plazas. It is a dual-two carriageway with four lanes (two lanes on either direction).

History 
It is formerly known as DUKE Phase 3,  and a part of the DUKE Extension Expressway Project but upon construction it is changed to a different name and uses  instead. On 12 April 2021, the expressway has been given a title on the Malaysia Book Of Records for 2 categories with are the longest prestressed T shape concrete bridge and longest T shaped prestressed concrete beam. There are 424 BH beams used and the longest bridge that used the BH Girder is 67.5 meters long.

On 22 December 2021, Section 4 of the road (Taman Melati to Setiawangsa) was opened to the public. Currently, it is the only section of the road that is opened.

Features 

 The whole main link of the expressway will be elevated entirely.
 Starting at Kampung Pandan, the expressway will be a double-decker flyover.
One of only few highways in Malaysia to have a double-decker flyover.
 All toll plazas are elevated.
 Kuala Lumpur skyline can be seen on parts of the highway.

Toll rates

Junction list 

Below is a list of interchanges (exits) and toll plazas along Setiawangsa - Pantai Expressway. Exits are arranged in ascending numerical order from North to South. The entire highway is in Federal Territory of Kuala Lumpur. Section 4 (Taman Melati to Setiawangsa) of the highway is the only opened section currently. 

Legend: 

 I/C - interchange, I/S - intersection, RSA - Rest and service area, OBR - overhead bridge restaurant, L/B - layby, V/P - vista point, TN - tunnel, T/P - toll plaza, BR - bridge

1.000 km = 0.621 mi; 1.000 mi = 1.609 km
 Concurrency Terminus •  Incomplete access •  Unopened

Controversy 
 Jalan U-Thant residents filed a lawsuit claiming the expressway built next to their houses disregards the impact on their health and well-being with the increased noise levels and air pollution. 
 A Facebook page was created protesting against the construction claiming many reasons the expressway is bad for a lot of aspects.

Progress 
Until December 2021, only sections of the highway from Taman Melati to Jelatek are fully completed and opened. The rest are still under construction or unpaved.

Gallery

See also 
 Duta–Ulu Klang Expressway
Kuala Lumpur Middle Ring Road 2
 List of expressways and highways in Malaysia

References 

Expressways in Malaysia
Expressways and highways in the Klang Valley